Mitja Kovačević (born 12 April 1991 in Ljubljana) is a Slovenian footballer who plays as a defender.

Kovačević made his debut for Olimpija at 14 November 2010 against Domžale. On 22 January 2011, he signed a four-year deal with Olimpija.

References

1991 births
Living people
Footballers from Ljubljana
Slovenian footballers
Association football defenders
NK Olimpija Ljubljana (1945–2005) players
NK Olimpija Ljubljana (2005) players
NK Aluminij players
Slovenian PrvaLiga players